Yordanka Donkova (born 28 September 1961) is a Bulgarian former hurdling athlete, notable for winning an Olympic gold medal and bronze medal as well as nine medals at European indoor and outdoor championships. Donkova set four 100 m hurdles world records in 1986. Her fifth world record, a time of 12.21 set in 1988, stood for almost 28 years until broken in 2016 by Kendra Harrison.

In total, Donkova has 16 medals from major athletics tournaments.

Personal life 
Donkova suffered a childhood accident, which resulted in her losing two fingers on her right hand. She has three children. In 1991 she gave birth to a son called Zhivko Atanasov - professional football player, currently playing for Levski Sofia; twin girls Daniela and Desislava followed in 1996.

After the 1988 Seoul Olympics, Donkova received an offer to compete for the United States, but refused to change her national allegiance and continued to represent Bulgaria.

Major achievements 
Five-time Bulgarian National Champion at 100 m hurdles, 1980, 82, 84, 86 & 94.

CR = Championship Record

World records
Donkova set five world records for the 100 metres hurdles:
12.36 sec - August 13, 1986 (equalling the record of Grażyna Rabsztyn)
12.35 sec - August 17, 1986
12.29 sec - August 17, 1986
12.26 sec - September 7, 1986
12.21 sec - August 20, 1988 (the world record stood until July 22, 2016)

References

Bibliography

External links

 Y. Donkova - Olympic record 12:38 | Seoul 1988 г. | video YouTube video
 Y. Donkova - Olympic games 3td place | Barselona 1992 г. | video
 Y. Donkova improve world record four times in 1986 | video

1961 births
Living people
Bulgarian female hurdlers
People from Sofia City Province
Athletes (track and field) at the 1980 Summer Olympics
Athletes (track and field) at the 1988 Summer Olympics
Athletes (track and field) at the 1992 Summer Olympics
World record setters in athletics (track and field)
Olympic athletes of Bulgaria
Olympic gold medalists for Bulgaria
Olympic bronze medalists for Bulgaria
European Athletics Championships medalists
Medalists at the 1992 Summer Olympics
Medalists at the 1988 Summer Olympics
Olympic gold medalists in athletics (track and field)
Olympic bronze medalists in athletics (track and field)
Goodwill Games medalists in athletics
World Athletics Indoor Championships medalists
Competitors at the 1986 Goodwill Games
Friendship Games medalists in athletics